Durucasu can refer to:

 Durucasu, Göle
 Durucasu, Osmancık
 Durucasu, Taşova